This is a list of mandolinists, people who have specifically furthered the mandolin by composing for it, by playing it, or by teaching it. They are identified by their affiliation to the instrument.

First generation mandolinists (c. 1744 - 1880)

 Bartolomeo Bortolazzi (1733-1820)
 Luigi Castellacci
 Giovanni Cifolelli
 Pietro Denis (1720-1790)
 Giovanni Fouchetti (1757-1789)
 Alexandro Marie Antoin Fridzeri
Carlo Antonio Gambara
 Giovanni Battista Gervasio (c.1762-1784)
 Giovanni Hoffmann (also Johann Hoffmann) (1770-c.1814) (Vienna)
 Vincent Houška (1766-1840) (Czechoslovakia)
 Wenzel Krumpholz (1750-1870)
 Carmine de Laurentiis
 Gabriele Leone;(1732-1770)
 Carlo Sodi (1715-1788)
 Giovanni Vailati (1815-1890)
 Mademoiselle de Villeneuve (1770)
 Pietro Vimercati (?-1850)

Golden age mandolinists (c. 1880 - c. 1920)

 
 Michele Salvatore Ciociano (1874-1944) (Italy)
 Valentine Abt (1873-1942) (United States)
 Pietro Armanini (1844-1895) (Italy)
 Edgar Bara (1876-1962)
 Giuseppe Bellenghi (1847-1902)
 Giuseppe Branzoli (1835-1909) (Italy)
 Raffaele Calace (1863-1934) (Italy)
 Jules Cottin (1868-1922)
 Ferdinando de Cristofaro (1846-1890)
 Carlo Curti (1859-1926) (Italy, United States, Mexico)
Bernardo De Pace (1881-1966)
 Herbert J. Ellis (1865-1903)
 James Reese Europe (1881-1919) (United States)
 Giovanni Gioviale (1885-1949) (Italy)
 George H. Hucke (1868-1903)
 Nikolaos Lavdas (1879-1940)
 Salvador Léonardi (1872-1938) (Italy)
 Eduardo Mezzacapo (1832-1898)
 Carlo Munier ( 1859-1911) (Italy)
 W. Eugene Page (American)
 Clarence L. Partee (1864-1915) (Italy, United States)
 Giuseppe Pettine (1874-1966) (Italy, United States)
 Jean Pietrapertosa (1855-1940)
 Silvio Ranieri (1882-1956) (Italy)
 Arling Shaeffer (1859-after 1938) (United States)
 Samuel Siegel (1875-1948) (United States)
 Giuseppe Silvestri (1841-1921)
 Giovanni Vicari (1905-1985) (United States)
 Seth Weeks (1868-1953) (United States)
 Bob Yosco (1874-1942) (Italy, United States)

Modern mandolinists 1920 to present (deceased)

Classical
 Giuseppe Anedda (1912-1997) (Italy) (classical)
 Nino Catania (1907-1985) (Italy)
 Matteo Casserino (1911-2001) (United States)
 Rudy Cipolla (1900-2000) (United States)
 Samuel Firstman
 Kurt Jensen (1913-1911) (Australia)
 Yasuo Kuwahara (1946-2003) (Japan)
 Jiro Nakano (1902-2000) (Japan)
 Takashi Ochi (1934-2010) (Japan)
 Alison Stephens (1970-2010) (Great Britain)
 Morishige Takei (1890-1949) (Japan)
 Konrad Wölki (1904-1983) (Germany)

Blues
 Howard Armstrong (1909-2003) (United States), Tennessee Chocolate Drops

|  style="width:25%; vertical-align:top;"|
 Willie Black (United States) (blues), Whistler And His Jug Band
 Dink Brister (1914 - 1991) (United States) (blues)
 Rory Gallagher (1948-1995) (Ireland)
 Jim Hill (United States) (blues)
 Charles Johnson (United States) (blues)
 Coley Jones (circa 1880s – 1930s) (United States) (blues), Dallas String Band
 Big Jack Johnson (1940-2011)
 Bobbie Leecan (1897-1946) (United States) (blues), Need More Band
 Alfred Martin (United States) (blues)
 Carl Martin (1906-1979) (United States) (blues)
Charlie McCoy (1909-1950) (United States) (blues)
 Al Miller (United States) (blues)
 Matthew Prater (United States) (blues)
 Herb Quinn (United States) (blues)
 James "Yank" Rachell (1910-1997) (United States) (blues)

| style="width:25%;"|
 Johnny Winter (1944-2014) (United States) 
 Johnny "Man" Young (1918-1974) (United States) (blues)

Bluegrass
 Charlie Bailey (1916-2004) (bluegrass) (old-time music), The Bailey Brothers
 Bill Bolick (1919-1998) (United States) (country)
 Jethro Burns (1920-1989) (United States) (country/bluegrass/jazz)
 Joseph Allen "Joe" Carr (1951-2014)
 John Duffey (1934-1996) (United States) (bluegrass), Country Gentlemen, Seldom Scene
 Bill Monroe (1911-1996) (United States) (bluegrass)
 Tiny Moore (1920-1987) (United States)(country/bluegrass/jazz)
 Tut Taylor (1923-2015) 

Carnatic
 U. Srinivas (1969-2014) (India)

Choro
 Jacob do Bandolim (1918-1969) (Brazil) (Choro, Samba-canção

Country
 Karl Davis (1905-1979) (Country music),, Renfro Valley Boys, Cumberland Ridge Runners
 Walter Louis "Hank" Garland (1930-2004)
 Pee Wee Lambert (1924-1965) (United States) (Country music), Stanley Brothers

Gospel
 Katie Bell Nubin (United States) (gospel)

Jazz
 Dave Apollon (1898-1972) (United States) (jazz)
 Sinn Sisamouth (c. 1932- c. 1976) 

Old Timey
 Mike Seeger (1933-2009)

Southern rock
 Allen Woody (1955-2000), The Allman Brothers Band, Gov’t Mule

Modern mandolinists 1920 to present

Mainly classical

Belgium
 Ralf Leenen
Royal Estudiantina La Napolitaine

Bulgaria
 Oleg Videnov

France
 Cécile Valette, Nov' Mandolin Trio
 Annick Robergeau
 Olivia Tarallo-Valgelata
 Cécile Valette

Germany
 Marga Wilden-Hüsgen
 Veronika Schlereth
 Sabine Spath
 Steffen Trekel, Duo Trekel-Tröster
 Detlef Tewes

Great Britain
 Simon Mayor
 Frances Taylor

India
 U. Rajesh

Israel
 Avi Avital
 Jacob Reuven, Kerman Mandolin Quartet, Barrocade
 Alon Sariel

|  style="width:25%; vertical-align:top;"|
Italy
 Carlo Aonzo
 Andrea Bazzoni
 Matthew Bonizzoni, International Mandolin Orchestra
 Emanuele Cappellotto
 Céline Cellucci, Ensemble Gabrielle Leone, Pizzicato Ensemble
 Freddy Colt
 Dorina Frati
 Fabio Gallucci, Nov' Mandolin Trio
 Maria Cleofe Miotti
 Ugo Orlandi (Italy)
 Roberto Palumbo
 Giorgio Pertusi, International Mandolin Orchestra
 Amelia Saracco
I Solisti Veneti
 Mauro Squillante
 Clara Ponzoni
 Miriam Zaniboni, International Mandolin Orchestra

Japan
 Ryo Aoyama

 Onishi Kozo
 Izumi Toru
 Hidenori Yoshimizu

Netherlands
 Ferdinand Binnendijk
 Marina Eckhardt

Portugal
 Fabio Machado
 Norberto Gonçalves da Cruz

Puerto Rico
 Gustavo Batista  - 

Russia
 Natalya Kravets
 Natalia Marashova
 Elena Zabavskay
 Ekaterina Mochalova

Spain
 Juan-Carlos Muñoz

Switzerland
 Giorgio Borsani
 Giorgio Caneva, Orchestra mandolinistica di Lugano

 Paolo Stirnimann, International Mandolin Orchestra

United States
 Butch Baldassari (bluegrass)
 Joseph Brent
 John Craton (classical)
 David Evans
 Neil Gladd (Classical)
 Marilynn Mair, Mair-Davis Duo, Mandolin World Summit, Enigmatica 
 Evan Marshall
 Emanuil Sheynkman
 Radim Zenkl (Czechoslovakia) (bluegrass, jazz), Mandolin World Summit

Blues

Ry Cooder (United States)
 Bert Deivert (United States) (Sweden)
 Rich DelGrosso (United States)
 Andra Faye (United States)
 Billy Flynn (United States)
 Alvin Youngblood Hart
 Jimi Hocking (Australia)
 Gerry Hundt (United States)
 Steve James (United States)
 Pokey Lafarge
 Barry Mitterhoff
 Otis Taylor (United States)
 Hans Theessink (Netherlands)
Marc Woodward (United Kingdom) (United States)

Bluegrass

 Darin Aldridge, The Circuit Riders
Lloyd Armstrong
 Jeff Austin, Yonder Mountain String Band
 Alan Bibey, Baucom, Bibey, Graham & Haley 
 Robert Bowlin
 Jesse Brock
 Sam Bush
 Mike Compton
 Sharon Gilchrist
 David Grisman
David Harvey (luthier)
Sierra Hull
 Doyle Lawson
 Tashi Litch, Brograss
 David Long
 Mike Marshall
 Ronnie McCoury, Del McCoury Band
 Jesse McReynolds
 Buddy Merriam
 Barry Mitterhoff
 Tim O'Brien
 Bobby Osborne
 Georgi Palmov (Russia), Kukuruza, Seldom Scene
 Tom Rozum
Sandy Rothman, Jerry Garcia Acoustic Band
 Jon Sholle
 Herschel Sizemore
 Ricky Skaggs, Clinch Mountain Boys, The Country Gentlemen, Kentucky Thunder
 Johnny Staats
 Andy Statman
 Adam Steffey
 Mark Stoffel, Chris Jones and the Night Drivers
 Bryan Sutton
 Chris Thile (classical), Punch Brothers, Nickel Creek
 Niall Toner (Ireland)
 Graham Townsend 
 Joe Val
 Rhonda Vincent
 Joe K. Walsh
 Frank Wakefield
 Kym Warner (Australia)
 Sean Watkins
Roland White
Paul Williams, The Sunny Mountain Boys

Choro

Danilo Brito, Spoleto 

Hamilton de Holanda

Déo Rian

Country

Paul Buskirk
 Mark Casstevens
 Walter Garland, Played mandolin on Tanya Tucker's San Antonio Stroll in concerts, 1994
 Vince Gill (United States)
 Johnny Gimble
 Aubrey Haynie
John Jorgenson
Cheyenne Kimball
Ira Louvin
Martie Maguire of Dixie Chicks and Court Yard Hounds
Emily Robison, Dixie Chicks, Court Yard Hounds
 Marty Stuart (United States)
 Jerry Swallow
Oscar Sullivan, Lonzo and Oscar
 Lisa Theo, Ranch Romance
 Billy Joe Walker
 Charlie Worsham

Mix: Americana, American folk, progressive bluegrass, blues, jazz, rock, country

Larry Campbell (rock, blues, country, folk and Celtic styles)
 Ry Cooder
David Grisman
Richard Kriehn, The Guy’s All-Star Shoe Band
Sarah Jarosz
 David Lindley (musician)
Peter Ostroushko

Irish

 Paul Brady
 Andy Irvine (Ireland)
 Paul Kelly (Ireland)
 Mick Moloney (Ireland)
 Johnny Moynihan (Ireland)
 John Sheahan (Ireland)

British folk and folk rock

Ritchie Blackmore
Blackmore's Night
Marla Fibish
Chris Leslie, Fairport Convention, Whippersnapper, St.Agnes Fountain (Band)
 Graham Lyle, McGuinness Flint
 Dave Swarbrick, Fairport Convention

Rock

 Ian Anderson (Great Britain), Jethro Tull
Eric Bazilian, mandolin part of Joan Osborne's St. Teresa
 Tim Brennan, Dropkick Murphys
 Peter Buck (United States), R.E.M., mandolin part of Losing My Religion
 Dash Crofts, Seals and Crofts
 Rory Gallagher (Ireland), Going to My Hometown
David Gilmour, Pink Floyd
 "Maestro" Alex Gregory (United Kingdom) (Heavy Metal)
 David Grisman
mandolin part on Grateful Dead's Friend of the Devil
 Levon Helm, The Band
 Chris Hillman, The Byrds, mandolin part of Sweet Mary
 Ray Jackson, mandolin part of Rod Stewart's Maggie May, Lindisfarne (band)
John Paul Jones (United Kingdom), Led Zeppelin, mandolin part of Gallows Pole
 Bernie Leadon (United States)
 Jimmy Page (United Kingdom), Led Zeppelin
 Mick Ronson, Mott the Hoople, :mandolin part of I Wish I was Your Mother''
 Jack White (United States), The White Stripes
 Pete Zorn (United States / United Kingdom), Richard Thompson's touring band, Steeleye Span

Japanese pop and anime music
 Seishin

Jazz

John Abercrombie
 Jason Anick
 Joseph Brent
 Paul Glasse
Michael Kang
The String Cheese Incident
 John Kruth
 Emory Lester (United States)(Canada) (bluegrass, new age)
Don Stiernberg (classical, country, some rock)
 Patrick Vaillant (France)
 Tim Ware

Gospel music / klesmer
Andy Statman (klesmer, bluegrass)
Gerrey Tenney (klesmer, Americana-bluegrass)

Mandolin orchestras

 Mandolin Society of Peterborough

References

External links
 Best mandolin rock songs

 
Mandolinist